Processed meat is considered to be any meat which has been modified in order to either improve its taste or to extend its shelf life. Methods of meat processing include  salting, curing, fermentation, smoking, and/or the addition of chemical preservatives. Processed meat is usually composed of pork or beef, but also poultry, while it can also contain offal or meat by-products such as blood. Processed meat products include bacon, ham, sausages, salami, corned beef, jerky, hot dogs, lunch meat, canned meat, chicken nuggets, and meat-based sauces. Meat processing includes all the processes that change fresh meat with the exception of simple mechanical processes such as cutting, grinding or mixing.

Meat processing began as soon as people realized that cooking and salting prolongs the life of fresh meat. It is not known when this took place; however, the process of salting and sun-drying was recorded in Ancient Egypt, while using ice and snow is credited to early Romans, and canning was developed by Nicolas Appert who in 1810 received a prize for his invention from the French government.

Preservatives 

The preservative sodium nitrite (E250) (mixed into curing-salt) is well known for its supposed role in inhibiting the growth of Clostridium botulinum bacteria spores in processed and refrigerated meats. However, a 2018 study by the British Meat Producers' Association determined that legally permitted levels of nitrite have no effect on the growth of the Clostridium botulinum bacteria which causes botulism, in line with the UK’s Advisory Committee on the Microbiological Safety of Food opinion that nitrites are not required to prevent C. botulinum growth and extend shelf life.

A principal concern about sodium nitrite is the formation of carcinogenic nitroso-compounds in meats containing sodium nitrite or potassium nitrate, especially nitrosyl-haem. In addition to nitrosyl-haem, carcinogenic nitrosamines can be formed from the reaction of nitrite with secondary amines under acidic conditions (such as occurs in the human stomach) as well as during the curing process used to preserve meats. 

Nitrate and nitrite are consumed from plant foods as well as animal foods, with 80% of a typical person's nitrate consumption coming from vegetables, especially leafy and root vegetables such as spinach and beets. Some nitrate is converted to nitrite in the human body. Nitrate and nitrite are classified as generally recognized as safe (GRAS) by the U.S. Food and Drug Administration, and are not directly carcinogenic. Yet, when nitrate or nitrite interact with certain components in meat, such as heme iron, amines, and amides, they can form nitroso compounds, which may contribute to the association between consumption of processed meats and higher incidence of colorectal cancer.

Relationship to cancer 
The International Agency for Research on Cancer (IARC) at the World Health Organization (WHO) classifies processed meat as Group 1 (carcinogenic to humans), because the IARC has found sufficient evidence that consumption of processed meat by humans causes colorectal cancer.

A 2016 report by the American Institute for Cancer Research and the World Cancer Research Fund found that processed meat consumption also increases the risk of stomach cancer.

References

Further reading

 Coudray, Guillaume. Who poisoned your bacon? The dangerous history of meat additives. London: Icon Books, 2021.  
 Horowitz, Roger. Putting Meat on the American Table. Taste, Technology, Transformation. Johns Hopkins University Press, 2005.

External links

Meat processing technology for small- to medium-scale producers  Gunter Heinz, Peter Hautzinger, Food and Agriculture Organization of the United Nations (FAO) Regional Office for Asia and the Pacific (RAP), Bangkok, 2007, 
Introduction 

Meat
IARC Group 1 carcinogens